Alamode (Allamod) was a thin, soft, fine, and lustrous silk material. It was one of England's local silk varieties. However, it was recognized as ''Alamode'' in the early 17th century before it was famous for its use in scarves.

Weave 
It was a plain weave fabric.

Use 
The use of Alamode extended up to the 18th century, and it was majorly used in scarves and hoods. In addition, it was used for jackets and also as a mourning cloth.

See also 

 Alacha, a silk that was imitated in England after prohibiting imports from India.

References 

Woven fabrics
Silk